Vitaliy Heorhiyovych Pushkutsa (born 13 July 1974 in Reni) is a Ukrainian football coach and a former player.

References

1974 births
Living people
Soviet footballers
FC Olympik Kharkiv players
Ukrainian footballers
Ukraine under-21 international footballers
FC Metalist Kharkiv players
Ukrainian Premier League players
FC Arsenal Kyiv players
FC Dynamo-2 Kyiv players
FC Mariupol players
FC Chernomorets Novorossiysk players
Russian Premier League players
Ukrainian expatriate footballers
Expatriate footballers in Russia
FC Metalist-2 Kharkiv players
FC Vorskla Poltava players
FC Arsenal Kharkiv players
Ukrainian football managers
Association football forwards
Sportspeople from Odesa Oblast